= Soviet troops =

Soviet troops may refer to:

- Red Army, of the Russian SFSR then the Soviet Union from 1918 to 1946
- Soviet Army, of the Soviet Union from 1946 to 1991 (then the Commonwealth of Independent States until 1992)
